Aqchay-e Vosta (also Romanized as Āqchāy-e Vosţá; also known as Āgh Chāy Vasaţ, Āqā Chāy-e Vasaţ, Āqchāy Bābā ‘Alī Qeshlāqī, and Āq Chāy-e Vasaţ) is a village in Yurchi-ye Sharqi Rural District, Kuraim District, Nir County, Ardabil Province, Iran. At the 2006 census, its population was 10, in 5 families.

References 

Tageo

Towns and villages in Nir County